Miloud Hadefi Stadium, or officially Stade Miloud-Hadefi, is a multi-use stadium in Belgaïd, in the Bir El Djir suburb of Oran, Algeria. Completed in 2019, it is used mostly for football matches. It has a capacity of 40,143 people.
The value of construction work of the stadium was about 142,3 million US$, it  is an olympic stadium with the athletics track and it is a part of the Miloud Hadefi Olympic Complex which is the first big complex in Algeria exceeding the Mohamed Boudiaf Olympic Complex in Algiers and it is also the first stadium entirely covered in Algeria. The stadium expected to be special for the Algeria national football team with Stade du 5 Juillet and Nelson Mandela Stadium, and also clubs of Oran especially MC Oran.
The Miloud Hadefi Stadium and all the complex which extends over a total area of 105 hectares, including all the infrastructure essential to the organization of international sports and football events. The stadium was used as the opening and closing ceremony venue of the 2022 Mediterranean Games.
The inaugural match of the stadium was held on 17 June 2021, when Algeria beat Liberia 5-1 in a friendly game.

Stadium

Characteristics
The stadium has been inspired by the San Nicola Stadium in Bari, built in 1990, which was designed by the Italian architect Renzo Piano.

Construction

On December 20, 2006, planned the project of construction of the Olympic Complex. The stadium was planned for a capacity of 75,000 seats but was reduced to 40.000.
On December 5, 2011, the minister of Youth and Sports, El Hachemi Djiar, announced that the stadium would be completed before the end of 2012. He also added that the entire project would be finished in 2015. But due to delays in construction work, the complex was finished in 2019.

Name of the stadium
In 2014, M. Mohamed Raouraoua president of the Algerian Football Federation suggested that the stadium can take the name of the former legendary footballer of MC Oran and of the national team Abdelkader Fréha. Some other names were suggested like the other former legendary footballer Miloud Hadefi. Finally he kept the name of Olympic Stadium of Oran but it's called Miloud Hadefi Stadium.

Name of the olympic complex
In the bigining of June 2022, the olympic complex was named Benhaddou Bouhadjar aka Colonel Othmane Olympic Complex. But on 23 June 2022, the complex was inaugurated and renamed by President Abdelmadjid Tebboune in the name of the former international footballer and of MC Oran, Miloud Hadefi and therefore became the Miloud Hadefi Olympic Complex.

Handover and opening

Tenants and events
The Olympic Stadium hosted the events of 2022 Mediterranean Games from the 25 june till 5 of july 2022. Also It will host all Algeria national football team matches starting from the first match against Uganda in the 2023 Africa Cup of Nations qualification.

2022 African Nations Championship

Transport connections
The stadium is part of the Oran Olympic complex that is situated just 5 minutes away from several bus stations and the Oran Tramway final destination stop that makes travelling to the stadium very easy from all regions of Oran.

Football matches
The stadium will host national and international matches. It was inaugurated by a friendly international game between Algeria A' and Liberia on 17 June 2021.

See also

List of football stadiums in Algeria
List of African stadiums by capacity
List of association football stadiums by capacity

References

External links

Future stadium images at worldstadiums.com

Football venues in Algeria
Sports venues in Oran
Multi-purpose stadiums in Algeria